Georgi Naydenov may refer to:
 Georgi Naydenov (businessman), Bulgarian businessman and banker
 Georgi Naydenov (footballer, born 1931), Bulgarian football goalkeeper and manager
 Georgi Naydenov (footballer, born 1936), Bulgarian football goalkeeper